Joseph Jamieson (March 15, 1839 – March 12, 1922) was a lawyer and political figure in Ontario, Canada. He represented Lanark North in the House of Commons of Canada from 1882 to 1891 as a Conservative member.

He was born in Sherbrooke, Lanark County, Upper Canada, the son of William Jamieson, an immigrant from Ireland, and was educated in Perth. In 1865, he married Elizabeth Carss. Jamieson was called to the Ontario bar in 1869. He served as reeve for Almonte, warden for Lanark County and chairman of the board of license commissioners for North Lanark. Jamieson ran unsuccessfully for a seat in the House of Commons in the 1878 federal election and an 1880 by-election. He resigned his seat in December 1891 after being named junior county judge for Wellington County.

References 
 
 The Canadian parliamentary companion, 1887, AJ Gemmill

1839 births
1922 deaths
Members of the House of Commons of Canada from Ontario
Conservative Party of Canada (1867–1942) MPs
Judges in Ontario
People from Almonte, Ontario
Mayors of places in Ontario